Roger Drury (died 1599) of Rollesby and Great Yarmouth, Norfolk, was an English politician.

He was a Member (MP) of the Parliament of England for Great Yarmouth in 1589.

References

Year of birth missing
1599 deaths
English MPs 1589
People from Great Yarmouth